Ironmaster is a 1983 film directed by Umberto Lenzi.

Production
Ironmaster was filmed on location at Custer State Park in South Dakota with interiors shot at RPA-Elios Studios in Rome.

Release
Ironmaster was released in Italy on 10 March 1983. The film was released on Blu-ray on 23 January 2017 in North America by Code Red and on 10 April 2017 in the United Kingdom by 88 Films.

Reception
According to Michael Klossner, author of Prehistoric Humans in Film and Television, Ironmaster received "few and very bad notices." Klossner responded that the film is "simple, only modestly ambitious and has its share of flaws. However, it's hard not to like a film which shows intelligent, articulate prehistoric people making discovers, facing moral issues and showing capacity for great evil and finally for good." Hal Erickson (AllMovie) stated that "Seldom there has then been a more predictable 98 minutes' worth of Sword and Sorcery, but that doesn't mean it isn't enjoyable."

References

Footnotes

Sources

External links
 

Films directed by Umberto Lenzi
Films shot in Rome
Films shot in South Dakota
French historical adventure films
Films set in prehistory
Peplum films
Sword and sandal
Sword and sandal films
Films produced by Luciano Martino
1980s Italian films